Thermistis croceocincta is a species of beetle in the family Cerambycidae. It was described by Saunders in 1839, originally under the genus Lamia. It is known from Laos, China, India, and Vietnam. It feeds on Quercus serrata and Cunninghamia lanceolata.

Varietas
 Thermistis croceocincta var. reducta Breuning, 1952
 Thermistis croceocincta var. apicalis Pic, 1923

References

Saperdini
Beetles described in 1839